Trehalose synthase may refer to:
 Alpha,alpha-trehalose synthase, an enzyme
 Maltose alpha-D-glucosyltransferase, an enzyme